Thectochloracarus is a genus of mites in the family Acaridae.

Species
 Thectochloracarus neotropicalis Fain, Engel, Flechtmann & OConnor, 1999

References

Acaridae
Taxa named by Michael S. Engel